Monteroni d'Arbia railway station is an Italian railway station on the Siena-Grosseto railway line in Southern Tuscany.

History
It was opened in 1927 as part of a line to connect Siena and Monte Antico to speed up travel between the cities of Siena and Grosseto. This line made a more direct connection than the Asciano-Monte Antico section that was opened along with the line from Monte Antico to the junction at Montepescali in 1872, and to this day services provide that connection, stopping at Monteroni d'Arbia. The station once had three platform faces, but recently the third platform's track has been removed. Most trains call at platform 2, but when trains pass, they use the loop onto platform 1.

Train services and movements
Regular passenger services to the station are regionale services, which run daily to Grosseto and Siena and in early mornings and evenings to Buonconvento, Empoli and Florence. There is also a daily regionale veloce service to Florence from Buonconvento.

Gallery

See also

History of rail transport in Italy
List of railway stations in Tuscany
Rail transport in Italy
Railway stations in Italy

References 

Railway stations in Tuscany
1927 establishments in Italy
Railway stations in Italy opened in the 20th century